Isoglossa  is a genus of flowering plants in the family Acanthaceae.

Selected species
 
 Isoglossa angusta 
 Isoglossa anisophylla 
 Isoglossa asystasioides 
 Isoglossa bondwaensis 
 Isoglossa bracteosa 
 Isoglossa bruceae 
 Isoglossa candelabrum 
 Isoglossa cataractarum 
 Isoglossa ciliata 
 Isoglossa clemensiorum 
 Isoglossa collina 
 Isoglossa comorensis 
 Isoglossa congesta 
 Isoglossa cooperi 
 Isoglossa cyclophylla 
 Isoglossa nervosa C.B.Clarke
 Isoglossa woodii
 Isoglossa eranthemoides, endangered, only collected from the Tweed River and Booyong, New South Wales

References

External links

 
Acanthaceae genera
Taxonomy articles created by Polbot